Ray Eklund was the head coach of the Kentucky Wildcats men's basketball team of the University of Kentucky in 1926.  He compiled a 15-3 record.  Eklund attended University of Minnesota.

References

External links
 coaching stats at BigBlueHistory.com

Year of birth missing
Year of death missing
Kentucky Wildcats men's basketball coaches
Minnesota Golden Gophers football players
All-American college football players
American football ends